Witold Wawrzyczek (born 22 May 1973) is a Polish former professional footballer who played as a midfielder.

External links
 

1973 births
Living people
People from Rybnik
Sportspeople from Silesian Voivodeship
Association football midfielders
Polish footballers
FC Energie Cottbus players
Karlsruher SC players
Dynamo Dresden players
Ruch Chorzów players
MKS Cracovia (football) players
Bundesliga players